Andrew College is a private liberal arts college in Cuthbert, Georgia.  It is associated with The United Methodist Church and is the ninth-oldest college in Georgia. Andrew is accredited by the Southern Association of Colleges and Schools Commission on Colleges (SACSCOC). The college awards Associate of Arts (AA), Associate of Music (AM), Associate of Science (AS) degrees, an Associate Degree in Nursing (ADN), as well as Bachelor of Science in Business Administration (BSBA), Bachelor of Science in Organizational Leadership, and a Bachelor of Science, Elementary Education (BSEE). Additionally, students can earn a Certificate of Cancer Registry Management, Certificate in Church Music, and an on-line degree in Agribusiness and Communications.

Andrew is home to four student residence halls, a full-service dining hall, an updated student center, and an on-campus library. The campus also houses an intramural field and off-campus baseball, softball, and soccer. In addition to the outdoor athletic facilities offered, students also enjoy access to the Jinks Physical Education Complex with racquetball courts and a weight room.

History
Andrew College was granted its charter as Andrew Female College by the Georgia General Assembly on January 15, 1854. At the time, it was the second oldest charter in the United States to give an educational institution the right to confer degrees upon women. It was named for Bishop James Osgood Andrew of the Methodist Episcopal Church, South.

In 1864, Andrew College was requisitioned by the Confederate Army and served as Hood Hospital during the American Civil War. It was one of three hospitals in Cuthbert. Despite its buildings being used as a hospital, classes continued on a limited basis, and female students assisted the wounded with tasks like reading and writing letters.

In 1892, a fire consumed the campus. The people of Cuthbert raised money to begin rebuilding the same year. That fall, the college reopened in what is now known as Old Main, a five-story Victorian, designed by Atlanta architect William H. Parkins, that was constructed for $25,000.  Parkins was the most significant architect practicing in Georgia in the immediate decades following the Civil War. He settled in Atlanta where he started the state's most successful architectural business, which lasted until his retirement in the late 1880s.

In 1917, Andrew became a junior college, and the institution became co-educational in 1956. In 2018, Andrew began offering a baccalaureate degree in Business and Bachelor of Science in Organizational Leadership (BS) and additional baccalaureate degrees are being developed.

The current president is Linda Buchanan, Ph.D., who has served since June 2015.

Accreditation
Andrew College is accredited by the Southern Association of Colleges and Schools Commission on Colleges (SACSCOC) to award associate degrees and baccalaureate degrees.

Student body
Approximately 65% of students live on campus. The student profile is evenly divided between male and female, with 49% male students and 51% female students. There are students from ten states and several countries.

An overwhelming majority of the college's student body originates from Georgia, Florida and Alabama, followed by scholars from other U.S. states and international students. Half of the students from Georgia matriculate from one of the 28 counties that constitute the Atlanta Metropolitan Statistical Area, and the remaining in-state students come to Andrew from larger South Georgia cities such as Columbus, Macon, and Albany.

The minimum SAT scores are 460 math and 460 verbal, or the ACT equivalent, and a high school GPA of 2.0 on a 4.0 scale.

Athletics
 Baseball - men's team
 Basketball - men's and women's teams
 Volleyball - women's team
 Fast pitch softball - women's team
 Golf - men's and women's teams
 Soccer - men's and women's teams
 Cross Country - men's and women's teams

Financial
Total tuition and fees plus room and board for the 2019–2020 academic year was $29,428 per student. However, with an institutional financial aid budget exceeding $2.1 million, access to the Georgia Tuition Equalization Grant and private support, Andrew's true cost is greatly reduced.

, the college has an endowment of $10,000,000.

Notable alumni
 Joe Nasco professional soccer player
 Zula Brown Toole first woman to found and publish a newspaper in Georgia
 Trai Byers, professional actor

References

External links
 Official website
 Official athletics website

Former women's universities and colleges in the United States
Educational institutions established in 1854
Junior colleges in Georgia (U.S. state)
Education in Randolph County, Georgia
Private universities and colleges in Georgia (U.S. state)
Universities and colleges accredited by the Southern Association of Colleges and Schools
Buildings and structures in Randolph County, Georgia
1854 establishments in Georgia (U.S. state)